Guigo II, sometimes referred to as Guy, or by the moniker "the Angelic", was a Carthusian monk and the 9th prior of Grande Chartreuse monastery, from 1174 to 1180.

He died possibly in 1188 or 1193, and is distinct from both Guigo I, the 5th prior of the same monastery, and the late thirteenth-century Carthusian Guigo de Ponte.

Works
His most famous book is most commonly known today as Scala Claustralium (The Ladder of Monks), though it has also been known as the Scala paradisi (The Ladder of Paradise) and the Epistola de vita contemplativa (Letter on the Contemplative Life, which is its subtitle). Drawing from Jacob's vision in Genesis 28.12 of angels ascending and descending a ladder to God, bringing human prayers to heaven and God's answers to earth, Guigo wrote an account to explain how the ladder was meant for those in the cloister, seeking the contemplative life. Guigo named the four steps of this "ladder" of Lectio Divina prayer, a practice which continues daily in contemporary Benedictine ritual meditation, with the Latin terms lectio, meditatio, oratio, and contemplatio. In Guigo's four stages one first reads, which leads to think about (i.e. meditate on) the significance of the text; that process in turn leads the person to respond in prayer as the third stage. The fourth stage is when the prayer, in turn, points to the gift of quiet stillness in the presence of God, called contemplation.

Scala Claustralium is considered the first description of methodical prayer in the western mystical tradition, and Guigo II is considered the first writer in the western tradition to consider stages of prayer as a ladder which leads to a closer mystic communion with God. The work was among the most popular of medieval spiritual works (in part because it commonly circulated under the name of the renowned Bernard of Clairvaux or even Augustine), with over one hundred manuscripts surviving. It was also translated into some vernacular languages, including into Middle English.

It is still a basic guide for those who wish to practice lectio divina.

Guigo II also wrote twelve Meditations, which were clearly less widely known as they survive in only a few manuscripts. From internal evidence, it appears they may have been written before the Scala Claustralium.

See also
 Christian meditation

References

Further reading

 Guigo the Carthusian, The Ladder of Monks and Twelve Meditations: A Letter on the Contemplative Life, trans Edmund Colledge and James Walsh, (London: Mowbray, 1978; reprinted Kalamazoo, MI: Cistercian Publications, 1981) [This was originally printed in the Sources Chretiennes series as Lettre sur la vie contemplative. Douze meditations, ed Edmund Colledge and James Walsh, SC 163]
 

Carthusians
1190s deaths
Year of birth unknown